Pseudodaphnella pulchella is a species of sea snail, a marine gastropod mollusk in the family Raphitomidae.

This is not Clathurella pulchella Garrett, 1873 (synonym of Hemilienardia purpurascens (Dunker, 1871) )

Description
(Original description) The shell is fusiform, acuminated, shining, longitudinally ribbed, crossed by transverse raised striae. The whorls are rounded. The suture is impressed. The aperture is oval. The siphonal canal is slightly produced aud recurved. The shell is pinkish-white with irregular pink spots over the surface. The apex is red.

Distribution
This marine species occurs off Hawaii.

References

 Neil, Kilburn Richard. "Genus Kermia (Mollusca: Gastropoda: Conoidea: Conidae: Raphitominae) in South African waters, with observations on the identities of related extralimital species." African Invertebrates 50.2 (2009): 217–236.

External links
 Moretzsohn, Fabio, and E. Alison Kay. "HAWAIIAN MARINE MOLLUSCS." (1995)
 

pulchella
Gastropods described in 1860